Obscura is a German technical death metal band from Landshut, founded by guitarist and vocalist Steffen Kummerer in 2002. The band have released six studio albums, a compilation album and twelve music videos since its formation. Their latest album A Valediction was released on 19 November 2021 via Nuclear Blast.

History

Illegimitation (2002–2003) 
Obscura was formed in late 2002 by guitarist Steffen Kummerer, drummer Jonas Baumgartl, guitarist Armin Seitz and bassist/vocalist Martin Ketzer with the name Illegimitation. Performing local shows, the band booked their own concept tour in Bavaria called "Blasting Bavaria Tour" in 2003, followed by editions in 2004, 2005 and 2007. The band recorded their first and only self titled demo in November 2003 with producer V.Santura (Triptykon, Pestilence, Dark Fortress). The demo contained four songs, received positive feedback within southern Germany and took root in underground circles. In early 2004, both Ketzer and Seitz left the band. On second guitar, Stephan Bergbauer joined to record their debut album in Summer 2004.

Retribution (2004–2007) 
The band entered Mastersound Studios in Fellbach, Germany with producer Alexander Krull of Atrocity, Leaves Eyes who pushed the band within a three-week lasting recording session. During the recordings the band was renamed after the Gorguts album Obscura. Finished in August 2004, Obscura self-released Retribution on 7 July 2005 and immediately started to work on a follow up release the same year. With the addition of Markus Lempsch on guitar and Jonas Fischer on bass the band re-released Retribution on their own label and toured alongside Suffocation within Europe in 2006. Performing at Brutal Assault Festival in Czech Republic, Mountains of Death Festival in Switzerland and Up From the Ground Festival in Germany, Obscura gained their fanbase and established a proper following in central Europe. In 2007 Obscura hot several festivals in Europe, followed by their first headlining tour in Southern and Eastern Europe with Agonize. The tour started in Athens, Greece and contained 22 shows in Croatia, Serbia, Bosnia, Macedonia, Hungary, Slovakia, Germany and France. While Markus Lempsch and Jonas Baumgartl left the band in early 2007, Obscura performed as a three piece with session drummer Matthias Landes of Dark Fortress and Noneuclid. Johannes Rennig (Profanity) entered Obscura on guitar in October 2007. In November 2007, drummer Hannes Grossmann (ex-Necrophagist) and fretless bassist Jeroen Paul Thesseling (ex-Pestilence) were recruited as new permanent members, followed by guitarist Christian Muenzner (ex-Necrophagist) in February 2008 to replace Johannes Rennig.

Cosmogenesis (2008–2010) 

In September 2008, Obscura signed with Relapse Records and released its second full-length album Cosmogenesis in early 2009. The album sold around 900 copies in the US in its first week and debuted at number 71 on the Top New Artist Albums chart. The band started their first-ever North American tour as part of the Cosmogenesis Worldtour in April 2009 alongside Cannibal Corpse. Within one year the band played more than 160 shows all over the world as support for Atheist, the Black Dahlia Murder and Cannibal Corpse. Their first headliner tour was in the USA. Obscura toured Japan as support for Nile and Triptykon in 2010. On 16 February 2010, Obscura reissued their debut album Retribution, remastered and repackaged with three bonus tracks. Obscura's official guitar tablature book for Cosmogenesis was released on 5 January. Cosmogenesis was listed by Metal Storm as one of the 100 most important death metal albums.

Omnivium (2011–2013) 

Obscura released Omnivium on 29 March 2011. The record was written over a period of two years, with members writing songs and sending them to each other over the internet. On a lyrical basis the album dealt with religion and the evolution of humankind, with Kummerer taking significant influence from Friedrich Schelling's "On Nature's Connection to the Spirit World" The album earned positive feedback around the world and entered US and German charts, selling 2,000 within the first week of release in the US. It debuted at number 11 on the USA's Top Heatseekers chart, and at number 14 on Germany's Media Control Newcomer chart.

The artwork for the album follows a specific color scheme as part of a four-album concept sequence. Orion Landau, who also published the artwork for the last two albums, was responsible for developing Kummerer's ideas for the cover art.

Thesseling left the band due to scheduling conflicts between Obscura and Pestilence. Later, Thesseling cited economic reasons as being the motive for rejoining Pestilence.

Thesseling was replaced with Linus Klausenitzer of the progressive death metal band Noneuclid, the band making the announcement in September 2011. Obscura started the 164 concert-long Omnivium Worldtour in their home town of Landshut, Germany, followed by a full European tour alongside Hate Eternal, Beneath the Massacre and Defiled. They also played a five-week tour supporting Children of Bodom and Devin Townsend within North America. On 10 August the band announced their first southeast Asian headlining tour, performing in Thailand, Indonesia, Singapore, and the United Arab Emirates. In November and December the same year a North American headlining tour followed, supported by Abysmal Dawn and Last Chance to Reason. In March–April 2012 the band headlined a European run with support by Spawn of Possession, Gorod and Exivious. To promote Omnivium, the band played a first headlining tour in Japan alongside Beneath the Massacre and Defiled in June 2012. In 2013 Obscura embarked on a European Tour alongside Death, with most of the shows sold out.

In late 2011 Obscura started an online crowdfunding scheme to pay for the release of a combination of their first demo, demos from the Cosmogenesis sessions and three cover songs from the bands Death, Atheist and Cynic. Within 60 days the band generated $14,600 in fan donations, almost five times their financial target.

In celebration of their tenth year as a band, the band played a special anniversary show on 15 December 2012, in Landshut, Germany, with support from Dark Fortress and Hokum. The show featured a reunion of the early members who recorded the first demo, Illegimitation. This show also marked the end of the Omnivium Worldtour. In March 2013, Obscura embarked on a European Tour supported by Aeon, Deadborn and Over Your Threshold.

Akróasis (2014–2017) 
In 2014, guitarist Christian Münzner left the band due to creative differences and his inability to tour as a result of his focal dystonia muscle spasms. Additionally, Hannes Grossmann left at the same time, citing his own interests in forming a separate band. Obscura then hired guitarist Tom Geldschläger and fusion drummer Sebastian Lanser of German jazz metal group Panzerballett.
Obscura was scheduled to tour the US with the new line up as a part of the 2015 Summer Slaughter Tour, but despite early applications for visas they were unable to perform. Prior to releasing the band's fourth record Akroasis Obscura announced Munich Guitar Institute graduate Rafael Trujillo as their new permanent lead guitarist, replacing Geldschläger who was released from his duties by Kummerer as of July 2015.

Obscura embarked on the "Akroasis World Tour" in Rome, Italy at 30 March alongside Death DTA. A Summer tour visiting major festivals such as Graspop Metal Meeting, Hammersonic Festival, Metaldays and many more followed in July and August. On 20 June, Obscura announced their headlining European tour supported by Revocation, Beyond Creation and Rivers of Nihil. Obscura then performed as part of the "Akroasis World Tour" three shows in Mexico.
Being part of Sepultura's Machine Messiah Tour 2018, Obscura supported the major act on a four-week long tour in Europe and the UK. Opening acts have been the US American bands Goatwhore and Fit for an Autopsy. With many shows sold out, this tour has been the biggest run in Europe for the band up to this date. In April 2018 the band returned to Japan, supported headlining the "Akroasis Japan Tour 2018", as part of the Akroasis World Tour. Due to great demand Obscura play two shows in Tokyo.

Diluvium (2018–2020) 
In January 2018, the band announced that they have completed their fifth full-length album, Diluvium  which was released on 13 July 2018 via Relapse. To promote the album, the band has announced a major headlining tour in North America in September and October 2018 with Beyond Creation, Archspire, Inferi and Exist as support acts. In 2019 followed by the European leg with Fallujah, Allegaeon and First Fragment, Obscura went to Australia and New Zealand before returning to Japan to headline a row of tours under the banner Diluvium. Supported by Jinjer and Alarum the band grew their fanbase in both Asia and Australia to new heights. In March and April 2020 the band embarked on a European tour supported by Dutch death metal veterans God Dethroned, Thulcandra and Fractal Universe. Covering Scandinavia, southern and central Europe as well as the Baltics, the 'Diluvium Europa' Tour became one of the most successful tours for the band.

A Valediction (2020–present) 
In April 2020, Obscura announced guitarist Rafael Trujillo, bassist Linus Klausenitzer and drummer Sebastian Lanser parting ways with the band due to musical differences. Shortly after the band announced that former fretless bass player Jeroen Paul Thesseling and former guitarist Christian Münzner rejoined the band. Their sixth album A Valediction was released on 19 November 2021, on Nuclear Blast. Also in November 2021, Obscura announced a North American tour featuring Abysmal Dawn, Vale of Pnath and Interloper in support of the album that will take place in 2022. For September and October 2022, Obscura announced a European Tour promoting "A Valediction" with support from Disillusion and Persefone. For February and March 2023, Obscura announced a North American tour alongside co-headliners Fleshgod Apocalypse, special guests Wolfheart and Thulcandra.

Musical styles and lyrical themes 
Obscura are known for playing technically and compositionally complex music, with several band members having studied music theory.

Founding member Kummerer devises the band's lyricism and imagery himself. Obscura's lyrics focus mainly on the writings of famous German philosophers. The band's second release, Cosmogenesis, presented their interest in philosophy, which Kummerer describes as being influenced by the works of Arthur Schopenhauer, and Johann Wolfgang von Goethe, with Omnivium showing a shift in interests, and being based solely on the work of German philosopher Friedrich Schelling.

In describing these lyrics, Kummerer states:
<blockquote>Cosmogenesis started with the beginning of our existence, the big bang theory if you want to say so, and deals with different layers and synonyms on a philosophical basis. The second, Omnivium, takes part of the evolution in many different layers such as the basic ape to human thought, religious topics, how the human individuals evolve within their existence and uses as its basic theme the novel On Nature's Connection to the Spirit World by Friedrich Schelling.</blockquote>

 Band members 

Current members
Steffen Kummerer – lead and rhtyhm guitar , vocals 
Christian Münzner – lead guitar 
Jeroen Paul Thesseling – bass 
David Diepold – drums 

Former members
Jonas Baumgartl – drums 
Martin Ketzer – bass, vocals 
Armin Seitz – lead guitar 
Markus Lempsch – lead guitar 
Jonas Fischer – bass 
Hannes Grossmann – drums 
Johannes Rennig – lead guitar 
Linus Klausenitzer – bass 
Sebastian Lanser – drums 
Tom Geldschläger – lead guitar 
Rafael Trujillo – lead guitar 

Touring musicians
Ernst "Azmo" Wurdak – bass 
Jürgen Zintz – lead guitar 
Gerd Pleschgatternig – bass 
Andreas "Hank" Nusko – bass 
Matthias "Seraph" Landes – drums 
Jacob Schmidt – bass 
Steve Di Giorgio – bass 
Linus Klausenitzer – bass 
Alex Weber – bass 
Gabe Seeber – drums 

 Timeline 

 Discography 

 Studio albums 
 Retribution (2006)
 Cosmogenesis (2009)
 Omnivium (2011)
 Akróasis (2016)
 Diluvium (2018)
 A Valediction (2021)

 Compilations 
 Illegimitation (2012)

 Demos 
 Illegimitation (2003)

 Books 
 Obscura – Cosmogenesis – Official Guitar tablature (2010)
 Obscura – Omnivium – Official Guitar tablature (2012)
 Obscura – Guitar Anthology – Official Guitar tablature (2015)
 Obscura – Akroasis – Official Guitar tablature (2016)
 Obscura – Akroasis – Official Bass tablature (2016)
 Obscura – Diluvium – Official Guitar tablature (2018)
 Obscura – Diluvium – Official Bass tablature (2018)
Obscura – A Valediction – Official Guitar Tablature (2021)

 Music videos 
 Anticosmic Overload (2009)
 Akróasis (2015)
 Ten Sepiroth (2016)
 Diluvium (2018)
 Mortification of the Vulgar Sun (2018)
 Emergent Evolution (2019)
 Solaris (2021)
 A Valediction (2021)
 Devoured Usurper (2021)
 When Stars Collide (2021)
 The Neuromancer (2022)
 Heritage'' (2022)

References

External links 

 Official website
 Obscura at Relapse Records
 

2002 establishments in Germany
German technical death metal musical groups
Musical groups established in 2002
Musical quartets
Nuclear Blast artists